Mawsonia is an extinct genus of prehistoric coelacanth fish. It lived in freshwater and brackish environments from the latest Jurassic to the mid-Cretaceous (Tithonian to Cenomanian stages, about 152 to 96 million years ago) of South America, eastern North America, and Africa. Mawsonia was first described by British paleontologist Arthur Smith Woodward in 1907.

Description

The fish has six fins: two on the top of the body, two on the sides, one at the end of its tail and one at the bottom of its tail. Rather than having teeth, the inside of the mouth was covered in small (1-2 mm) denticles. It reached at least  in length, although one specimen possibly exceeded , only rivaled by the related Trachymetopon.

Taxonomy 
The genus was named by Arthur Smith Woodward in 1907, from specimens found in the Early Cretaceous (Hauterivian) aged Ilhas Group of Bahia, Brazil.

Fossils have been found on three continents; in South America they have been found in the Bahia Group, Romualdo, Alcântara, Brejo Santo and Missão Velha Formations of Brazil, and the Tacuarembó Formation of Uruguay. In Africa, they are known from the Continental Intercalaire of Algeria and Tunisia, the Ain el Guettar Formation of Tunisia, the Kem Kem Group of Morocco, and the Babouri Figuil Basin of Cameroon, spanning from the Late Jurassic, to early Late Cretaceous. Fossils assigned to Mawsonia have also been found in Woodbine Formation of Texas, USA, then part of the island continent Appalachia.

The type species is Mawsonia gigas, named and described in 1907. Numerous distinct species have been described since then. M. brasiliensis, M. libyca, M. minor, and M. ubangiensis have all been proposed to be synonyms of M. gigas, although Léo Fragoso's 2014 thesis on mawsoniids finds M. brasiliensis valid and cautions against synonymizing M. minor without further examination. Several recent publications consider M. brasiliensis to be valid as well. Although initially considered to belong to this genus, "Mawsonia" lavocati is most likely referable to Axelrodichthys instead.

Ecology 
Mawsonia was native to freshwater and brackish ecosystems. The diet of Mawsonia and their mechanism of feeding is uncertain. It has been suggested that the denticles were used to crush hard shelled organisms (durophagy) or that prey was swallowed whole using suction feeding.

References

Further reading 
Fishes of the World by Joseph S. Nelson
History of the Coelacanth Fishes by Peter Forey
Discovering Fossil Fishes by John Maisey and John G. Maisey
The Rise of Fishes: 500 Million Years of Evolution by John A. Long
Evolution of Fossil Ecosystems by Paul Selden and John Nudds

Mawsoniidae
Prehistoric lobe-finned fish genera
Cretaceous bony fish
Albian life
Cenomanian life
Prehistoric fish of Africa
Cretaceous Africa
Fossils of Algeria
Cretaceous Morocco
Fossils of Morocco
Fossils of Tunisia
Prehistoric fish of South America
Cretaceous Brazil
Fossils of Brazil
Fossil taxa described in 1907